Narlık can refer to:

 Narlık, Ceyhan
 Narlık, Çorum
 Narlık, Yusufeli